Mikhalkovo is a rural locality (a village) in Vokhtozhskoye Rural Settlement, Gryazovetsky District, Vologda Oblast, Russia. The population was 10 as of 2002.

Geography 
Mikhalkovo is located 64 km east of Gryazovets (the district's administrative centre) by road. Aksyonovo is the nearest rural locality.

References 

Rural localities in Gryazovetsky District